Parinya Utapao (born January 30, 1988), simply known as Pin, is a Thai professional footballer who plays as a centre-back for Thai League 2 club Nakhon Pathom United.

Club career

Honours

Club
Nakhon Ratchasima
 Thai Division 1 League 
  Champions (1) : 2014

External links
 Profile at Goal

1988 births
Living people
Parinya Utapao
Parinya Utapao
Association football fullbacks
Parinya Utapao
Parinya Utapao
Parinya Utapao
Parinya Utapao
Parinya Utapao
Parinya Utapao